Caledonia House Hotel, also known as the Masonic Temple, is a historic hotel located at Caledonia in Livingston County, New York. It has a -story, symmetrical, five-by-three-bay main section with a -story wing. It was constructed in 1831–1833 of cut stone in the Federal style.  The elegant center entrance, Palladian facade windows, and affiliated decorative woodwork are especially noteworthy.  Built originally as a hotel and used as such through the 19th century, the structure now houses three commercial spaces on the first floor and the local masonic temple on the second and third floors and rear wing.

It was listed on the National Register of Historic Places on September 13, 2001.

External links
National Register of Historic Places

References

Hotel buildings on the National Register of Historic Places in New York (state)
Federal architecture in New York (state)
Hotel buildings completed in 1833
Buildings and structures in Livingston County, New York
National Register of Historic Places in Livingston County, New York